Perchloryl fluoride is a reactive gas with the chemical formula . It has a characteristic sweet odor that resembles gasoline and kerosene. It is toxic and is a powerful oxidizing and fluorinating agent. It is the acid fluoride of perchloric acid.

In spite of its small enthalpy of formation (ΔHf° = −5.2 kcal/mol), it is kinetically stable, decomposing only at 400 °C. It is quite reactive towards reducing agents and anions, however, with the chlorine atom acting as an electrophile. It reacts explosively with reducing agents such as metal amides, metals, hydrides, etc. Its hydrolysis in water occurs very slowly, unlike that of chloryl fluoride.

Synthesis and chemistry

Perchloryl fluoride is produced primarily by the fluorination of perchlorates. Antimony pentafluoride is a commonly used fluorinating agent:

 + 3 HF + 2  →  +  + 2 

 reacts with alcohols to produce alkyl perchlorates, which are extremely shock-sensitive explosives.  In the presence of a Lewis acid, it can be used for introducing the  group into aromatic rings via electrophilic aromatic substitution.

Applications

Perchloryl fluoride is used in organic chemistry as a mild fluorinating agent. It was the first industrially relevant electrophilic fluorinating agent, used since the 1960s for producing fluorinated steroids.  In the presence of aluminum trichloride, it has also been used as an electrophilic perchlorylation reagent for aromatic compounds.

Perchloryl fluoride was investigated as a high performance liquid rocket fuel oxidizer. In comparison with chlorine pentafluoride and bromine pentafluoride, it has significantly lower specific impulse, but does not tend to corrode tanks. It does not require cryogenic storage. Rocket fuel chemist John Drury Clark reported in his book Ignition!  that perchloryl fluoride is completely miscible with all-halogen oxidizers such as chlorine trifluoride and chlorine pentafluoride, and such a mixture provides the needed oxygen to properly burn carbon-containing fuels.

It can also be used in flame photometry as an excitation source.

Safety

Perchloryl fluoride is toxic, with a TLV of 3 ppm. It is a strong lung- and eye-irritant capable of producing burns on exposed skin. Its IDLH level is 100 ppm. Symptoms of exposure include dizziness, headaches, syncope, and cyanosis. Exposure to toxic levels causes severe respiratory tract inflammation and pulmonary edema.

References

Inorganic chlorine compounds
Oxyfluorides
Rocket oxidizers
Fluorinating agents
Perchloryl compounds
Sweet-smelling chemicals